"Looking for Paradise" is a 2009 single by singer Alejandro Sanz which features Alicia Keys.  It is the first single from Sanz's eighth studio album, Paraíso Express.  Released through Warner Music via music download on September 23, 2009. The song used in Ugly Betty episode "All the World's a Stage".

Music video
The music video was directed by Gil Green, and filmed in Barcelona, Spain during September.

Release
The single was first released to a members-only section of Sanz's fan club website on September 18, 2009, as a preview of the material; being completely released five days before through digital download.

Sanz said Billboard about the record: "I told Tommy Torres that I wanted it to have a very British pop sound with the rock touch that the songs call for,... Tommy did a perfect interpretation in that sense. Everything flowed in a very natural way."

In Brazil, the song was included in the international soundtrack of Tempos Modernos.

Chart performance
The song entered the U.S. Billboard charts on the week of October 10, 2009. It debuted at number 10 on the Latin Pop Songs chart. On the next week, it rise to number 4; at number 21 on the Hot Latin Songs chart and later, the song was the airplay gainer, rising to number 9, on its third week rise again to number 7; and at number 32 on the Tropical Songs chart. The song, so far, peaked at number 67 on the Billboard Radio Songs chart.
On the week of November 14, 2009, the song went to number 1 on the Billboard Latin Pop Songs chart and Tropical Songs chart. A week later, the song finally went to number 1 on the Billboard Hot Latin Songs chart. This was Keys' first number one on all three charts, which also made her the first African-American of non-Hispanic origin to reach number 1 on the Hot Latin Tracks.

Charts

Weekly charts

Year-end charts

See also
 List of number-one singles of 2009 (Spain)
 List of number-one Billboard Hot Latin Songs of 2009
 List of number-one Billboard Hot Latin Pop Airplay of 2009
 List of number-one Billboard Hot Latin Pop Airplay of 2010

References

2009 songs
Spanglish songs
Alejandro Sanz songs
Alicia Keys songs
Pop ballads
Songs written by Alejandro Sanz
Songs written by Alicia Keys
Number-one singles in Spain
Music videos directed by Gil Green
Warner Music Latina singles